Mount Merino, Kentucky is an unincorporated community near Irvington in Breckinridge County, Kentucky.

History
The school closed in 1843 and in 1854 the Mount Merino farm became the home for the Holy Guardian Angel Catholic Church, a mission of St. Theresa Parish at Rhodelia.

References

Populated places in Breckinridge County, Kentucky